Thomas Jeier (born 24 April 1947 in Minden) was raised in Frankfurt and started writing prose as a student. He proved himself an expert of North America's present and past by publishing travel guides, books on history, biographies and novels (in particular of the western genre). He was translated and published in the United States too.

References

External links 
Thomas Jeier's homepage (in German)
Elmar Kelton's homepage
Jory Sherman's Homepage
Official list of winners of the Friedrich Gerstäcker prize which shows Jeier's name for the year 1974

1947 births
20th-century German novelists
Writers from Frankfurt
Western (genre) writers
German children's writers
German biographers
Male biographers
German travel writers
German music journalists
Living people
20th-century biographers
German male novelists
20th-century German male writers
German male non-fiction writers